Modern Theology is a peer-reviewed academic journal published by Wiley. It publishes articles, review articles, and book reviews in the area of theology, with an ecumenical editorial policy.

Abstracting and indexing 
The journal is abstracted and indexed in ATLA Religion Database, EBSCO databases, Philosopher's Index, ProQuest databases, Religious & Theological Abstracts, and Scopus.

The editors-in-chief are Jim Fodor (St. Bonaventure University) and William T. Cavanaugh (DePaul University).

References

External links
 

Religious studies journals
Publications established in 1984
Wiley (publisher) academic journals
Quarterly journals
English-language journals